Vostok Exercises (Exercise East) may refer to the following Russian Federation military exercises:
Vostok 2010
Vostok 2018

See also
Exercise Zapad